Marilù Tolo (born Maria Lucia Tolo; 16 January 1944) is an Italian film actress. She appeared in more than 60 films between 1960 and 1985.

Life and career 
Born in Rome, Tolo, at a very young age, worked as an assistant of Mario Riva in the RAI variety show Il Musichiere.  She made her film debut at 16 years old in Alberto Lattuada's Sweet Deceptions.

She was also a fashion model, and a close friend of Italian stylist Valentino. Valentino said in an interview to Italian newspaper La Repubblica that Tolo was the only woman he had ever really loved.

Selected filmography

 Howlers in the Dock (1960) - Marilù
 I piaceri del sabato notte (1960) - La sartina - l'amante di Luigi
 Colossus and the Amazon Queen (1960) - Amazzone
 Sweet Deceptions (1960) - Margherita
 Le ambiziose (1961)
 Shéhérazade (1963) - Shirin
 Adultero lui, adultera lei (1963) - Lina
 The Terror of Rome Against the Son of Hercules (1964) - Olympia
 Messalina vs. the Son of Hercules (1964) - Ena
 The Triumph of Hercules (1964) - Princess Ate
 Marriage Italian Style (1964) - Diana the cashier
 The Magnificent Gladiator (1964) - Velida, Galienus' Daughter
 La Celestina P... R... (1965) - Silvana
 Le Chant du monde (1965) - Gina
 Juliet of the Spirits (1965) - TV Presenter (uncredited)
 Espionage in Lisbon (1965) - Terry Brown, 077's partner
 Una ráfaga de plomo (1965) - Yasmin
 Night of Violence (1965) - Sister of Carla Pratesi
 Balearic Caper (1966) - Sofia
 The Poppy Is Also a Flower (1966) - Sophia Banzo
 Your Money of Your Life (1966) - Violette
 To Skin a Spy (1966) - Anna
 Kiss the Girls and Make Them Die (1966) - Gioia
 Perry Grant, agente di ferro (1966) - Paola Kuriel
 Judoka-Secret Agent (1966) - Vanessa
 The Witches (1967) - Waitress (segment "Strega Bruciata Viva, La")
 Sept hommes et une garce (1967) - Carlotta
 The Oldest Profession (1967) - Marlene, Miss Physical Love (segment "Anticipation, ou l'amour en l'an 2000") (as Marilu Tolo)
 Django Kill... If You Live, Shoot! (1967) - Flory
 Casse-tête chinois pour le judoka (1967) - Jennifer
 The Killer Likes Candy (1968) - Sylva
 A Stroke of 1000 Millions (1968) - Prinzi
 Commandos (1968) - Adriana
 Candy (1968) - Conchita
 I dannati della Terra (1969) - Adriana
 Las trompetas del apocalipsis (1969) - Helen Becker
 Kill the Fatted Calf and Roast It (1970) - Verde
 Un été sauvage (1970)
 Roy Colt and Winchester Jack (1970) - Manila
 Gradiva (1970)
 Confessions of a Police Captain (1971) - Serena Li Puma
 Romance of a Horsethief (1971) - Manka
 The Double (1971) - Marie
 Eneide (1971) - Venus
 Long Live Your Death (1971) - Lupita
 We Are All in Temporary Liberty (1971) - Emilia - wife of Langellone
 My Dear Killer (1972) - Dr. Anna Borgese
 Shadows Unseen (1972) - Simona
 Bluebeard (1972) - Brigitt
 Jus primae noctis (1972) - Venerata
 Meo Patacca (1972) - Sora Nuccia
 Themroc (1973) - La secrétaire
 The Five Days aka Le Cinque Giornate (1973) - The Countess
 Riot in a Women's Prison (1974) - Susan
 Il trafficone (1974) - Rosalia / Macaluso's Wife
 Au-delà de la peur (1975) - Nicole
 Cours après moi que je t'attrape (1976) - Anita
 The Greek Tycoon (1978) - Sophia Matalas
 The Sleep of Death (1980) - Countess Elga
 Scorpion with Two Tails (1982) - Contessa Maria Volumna
 Marco Polo (1982, TV Mini-Series) - Donna Fiammetta
 Vacanze di Natale (1983) - Grazia Tassoni
 Il tassinaro (1983) - Fernanda
 The Last Days of Pompeii (1984, TV Mini-Series) - Xenia

References

External links

1944 births
Living people
People of Lazian descent
20th-century Italian actresses
Italian film actresses
Italian female models
Actresses from Rome